Bidževo is a village in the municipality of Struga, North Macedonia.

Demographics
As of the 2021 census, Bidževo had 290 residents with the following ethnic composition:
Albanians 207
Macedonians 71
Persons for whom data are taken from administrative sources 12

According to the 2002 census, the village had a total of 546 inhabitants. Ethnic groups in the village include:
Albanians 421
Macedonians 118
Others 7

References

Villages in Struga Municipality
Albanian communities in North Macedonia